The 32nd Kisei was held from January 2007 to 2008. The following players earned spots through not being eliminated in the group stage: Naoki Hane (4-1), Cho U (4-1), Kobayashi Satoru (4-1), Atsushi Kato (4-1), O Rissei (3-2) Hideki Komatsu (2-3), Norimoto Yoda (2-3), and Imamura Toshiya (2-3). Mimura Tomoyasu, Kunihisa Honda, Satoshi Yuki, and Cho Chikun were eliminated from group play and had to earn a spot through preliminary stages. The players who qualified through preliminary tournaments are Cho Chikun, Hiroshi Yamashiro, Shinji Takao, and Yuta Iyama. Players who ended with the two lowest records in the each league were eliminated from automatic berth into the next tournament while the 3 other players who were not eliminated or had the top record were given a place in the following year's groups.

Preliminaries

Group A

Group B

Group C

Group D

Main tournament

Group A

* Shinji Takao held the tiebreaker over Hiroshi Yamashiro.

Group B

** Naoki Hane held the tiebreaker over Toshiya Imamura.

*** Atsushi Kato held tiebreaker over Yuta Iyama.

Key:
Green - Winner of group; earns a spot in the challenger final.
Blue - Earns a place in the next edition's group stage.
Red - Eliminated from automatic berth; must qualify through preliminary stages.

Challenger finals

Finals

Key
W+ - Won by
R - Resignation

References 

2007 in go
Kisei (Go)
2008 in go